The India-Rubber Men is a 1929 crime novel by the British writer Edgar Wallace. It was part of a series of books featuring the character Inspector Elk of Scotland Yard.

Film adaptations
In 1938 it was turned into a film The Return of the Frog starring Gordon Harker.

It was loosely adapted into the 1962 West German film The Inn on the River, part of Rialto Film's long-running series of Wallace adaptations.

References

Characters
 William Elk - A retired inspector who comes out of hiding
 Harry Lime - The retired murderer Known as “The Frog” who faked his death
 Insp. Philo Johnstone - a man who is taking Elk’s place as inspector
 Mr. Wade - the officer patrolling the Mecca 
 Leila Smith - the woman who is the target of The Indian Rubber Men  
 Ned Acks - The mysterious man Who is trying to sell the Mecca
 Dr. Charles Ionn - A Doctor who Does the autopsy of the victims
 James -  Richard Gordon’s Butler and Valet
 Richard Gordon - a friend of William Elk Who comes to solve the case 
 Sir John Archibald - The Chief inspector of the police
 H.Kipp - A Spy Who stalks the river

1929 British novels
Novels by Edgar Wallace
British crime novels
British novels adapted into films
Hodder & Stoughton books